The Social Democrats of Montenegro (SD CG), also known as the Social Democrats (Montenegrin: Socijaldemokrate, Социјалдемократe, SD), is a centre-left political party in Montenegro formed in 2015 by a split faction of the SDP.

History
The party was founded in July 2015 after the split between two Social Democratic Party (SDP) vice-presidents Vujica Lazović and Ivan Brajović, that advocated unconditional support for the ruling Democratic Party of Socialists (DPS) and Prime Minister Milo Đukanović, with the party leader Ranko Krivokapić, who advocated pursuing an independent political course. Brajović, Minister of Transport and Maritime Affairs in the Government of Montenegro at the time, was chosen as the first president of the new party. After the 2016 parliamentary election, the party having won two seats in the Parliament of Montenegro, remain part of the government with two ministers while the Party leader Brajović was elected President of the Parliament of Montenegro. Following the 2020 parliamentary elections, the party gained one seat, bringing its total to three, but was not part of the formed government coalition, going into opposition, together with its coalition partner, the DPS, which has been in power in Montenegro since the introduction of the multi-party system in 1990.

On 30 January 2022, the Social Democrats elected a new president of the party, Damir Šehović, the former Minister of Education, replacing the former party president Ivan Brajović, who did not apply for a second term.

Elections

Parliamentary elections

Presidential elections

Positions held
Major positions held by Social Democrats of Montenegro members:

References

2015 establishments in Montenegro
Political parties established in 2015
Pro-European political parties in Montenegro
Social democratic parties in Montenegro
Montenegrin nationalism
Centre-left parties in Europe